Clown is a 2014 American supernatural horror film directed by Jon Watts in his feature directorial debut, produced by Mac Cappuccino, Eli Roth, and Cody Ryder, and written by Watts and Christopher Ford. It stars Eli Roth, Laura Allen, Andy Powers, and Peter Stormare. Visual effects for the clown monster were done by Jagdeep Khoza, Alterian, Inc., and Tony Gardner. Principal photography began in November 2012, in Ottawa. The film was released in Italy on November 13, 2014, in the United Kingdom on March 2, 2015, and in the United States on June 17, 2016, by Dimension Films. The film received mixed reviews from critics.

Plot
Kent McCoy, a real estate agent, is a loving husband and father who hosts a birthday party for his young son Jack. However, the clown hired for their party is unable to make it. Kent discovers an old clown costume in the basement of a house he is selling and puts it on. After the party, he falls asleep wearing the outfit, and the following day finds he cannot take it off.

He is forced to wear the costume to work, where he again tries to remove it. When he returns home, he complains about the situation to his wife, Meg. She is able to remove the fake nose but unintentionally wounds him in the process. The family dog, Shadow, accidentally eats the fake nose. Meg also realizes the clown's wig has become Kent's natural hair. Kent starts to exhibit strange behavior and experiences a deep sense of hunger, eating all the food in the house.

Kent enlists the help of Herbert Karlsson, the suit's previous owner. Karlsson begs him not to touch the costume, but after learning Kent is already wearing it, insists on meeting him at the old costume warehouse. Kent learns that the outfit is the hair and skin of an ancient Icelandic demon called the "Clöyne". Karlsson drugs Kent, revealing that dismemberment is the only way to prevent the metamorphosis and possession. Kent fights back and subdues Karlsson, and while driving him to the police station to report the assault, his fingers and toes begin to grow excessively, causing him to crash the car.

Kent decides to try to kill himself and goes to one of his properties. He shoots himself in the mouth, spattering the wall with rainbow blood, but quickly regenerates and survives. He then meets a child who attempts to befriend him. Kent tries to behead himself with a pair of buzz saws, but a fluke accident causes the saw blades to shatter apart, killing the boy. Kent realizes he wants to eat the child and does so before Meg finds him. Once at home, Kent tells Meg to chain him up in the basement, telling her not to let him out. He learns from Jack that one of his classmates had bullied him at school. Kent finds the bully and eats him.

Meanwhile, Meg is nearly attacked by Shadow, who has become possessed after eating the Clöyne's nose, but is rescued by Karlsson, who decapitates the dog. He tells Meg that the wearer can remove the suit only after eating five children. She also learns that Karlsson put on the costume to entertain the children at a hospital where his brother Martin worked many years ago. Martin smuggled five terminally ill children to feed the demon to free his brother. When Karlsson was released from the costume, the brothers tried and failed to destroy it.

Kent fully succumbs to the demon and sneaks into a local Chuck E. Cheese, where he devours one child in the ball pit and another in the tube slides. Blood and a severed arm flow down the slide, causing a panic, and the play zone and restaurant are evacuated. Meg finds Kent as Karlsson attempts to decapitate him with an axe. Before Kent can kill Karlsson, Meg tries to communicate with him. Instead, the demon orders her to find and feed him one more child in return for Kent's release. She must bring the fifth child to their "special place." Otherwise, the Clöyne will find and kill Jack. However, Meg refuses.

The Clöyne sneaks into the house and kills Meg's father Walt. Meg fights against him, but the demon attempts to devour their unborn baby from her womb. After cutting the demon's neck, Meg knocks his head off with a hammer and apologizes to Jack for everything. However, due to a muscle still attached to the body, the Clöyne revives. Meg finally rips off the demon's head, killing the monster and her husband. While embracing her son, she watches in horror as the Clöyne's skin melts away, revealing the decapitated Kent. The film ends with the costume and Kent's possession being packed away by the police as evidence.

Cast
 Eli Roth as Frowny the Clown/Clöyne
 Laura Allen as Meg McCoy
 Andy Powers as Kent McCoy
 Peter Stormare as Herbert Karlsson
 Elizabeth Whitmere as Denise
 Christian Distefano as Jack McCoy
 Chuck Shamata as Walt
 Robert Reynolds as Dr. Martin Karlsson
 Lucas Kelly as Colton
 Michael Riendeau as Robbie
 Matthew Stefiuk as Detective
 Miller Timlin as Camper

Production

In November 2010, Jon Watts and Christopher D. Ford uploaded a fake trailer to YouTube that announced Eli Roth would produce the film; Roth was not involved at the time. Roth spoke about the film, saying: "I loved how ballsy they were, issuing a trailer that said, 'From the Master of Horror, Eli Roth.' Some people thought I'd made the movie, or that it was another fake Grindhouse trailer... I really felt these guys deserved a shot, and that people are truly freaked out by evil clowns. It's new territory to make this a version of The Fly, where this guy can feel himself changing, blacking out only to find blood all over his clown suit. You're sympathetic toward a monster until the monster actually takes over."

Principal photography began in November 2012 in Ottawa. Roth joined as a producer, and Watts directed the film based on a screenplay co-written with Ford.

Music
Matt Veligdan composed the film's score, which also featured eight songs.

 Benjamin Dickinson – "Frowny the Clown"
 Brian McKenna – "Mexican Lindo"
 Jared Gutstadt – "Taste of Mexico"
 Gods of Fire – "The Long Walk"
 Matt Veligdan – "Sonata La Squarzona"
 Neil Sedaka – "King of Clowns"
 Matt Veligdan – "Hardship"
 Nirvana – "Everybody Loves a Clown"

Release
In September 2012, Dimension Films and FilmNation Entertainment acquired distribution rights to the film. The film was released on November 13, 2014 in Italy. The UK premiere was February 27, 2015, in Scotland at FrightFest Glasgow 2015, followed by the DVD and Blu-ray release March 2, 2015. The film was also released in the Philippines on March 25, 2015 and in Mexico on May 22, 2015. After being delayed, the film was released in the United States on June 17, 2016.

Reception
On the review aggregator website Rotten Tomatoes, Clown holds an approval rating of 46% based on 25 reviews, and an average rating of 4.6/10.

Dominic Cuthbert of Starburst rated it 7/10 stars and wrote, "Clown may be formulaic and filled up to the guts with familiar tropes, but it is tremendous fun and an effective body horror."  Howard Gorman of Scream magazine rated it 5/5 stars and wrote, "With Clown the filmmakers have created an all-new monster of demonic proportions and it's a concept that certainly deserves to spawn a sequel or two as the sky really is the limit."  Jeremy Aspinall of the Radio Times rated it 2/5 stars and described it as "efficiently put together if a little sedate in pace". Anton Bitel of Little White Lies wrote that the film doubles as an equally harrowing story of "a family man's losing struggle with his own paedophiliac impulses".  Brad Miska of Bloody Disgusting rated it 3/5 stars and wrote, "Even though it's mostly a bore, there's still some really cool and fun stuff scattered throughout."  Keri O'Shea of Brutal as Hell wrote, "Neither frightening nor funny, here's another lesson to prove that fake trailers are often fine just as they are."  Joel Harley of HorrorTalk rated it 2/5 stars and wrote, "What could have been one of the few great killer clown movies winds up as yet another disappointment, being too uneven in tone and pace to be considered a success."

References

External links
 
 

2010s American films
2010s English-language films
2010s monster movies
2010s serial killer films
2010s supernatural horror films
2014 directorial debut films
2014 films
2014 horror films
2014 horror thriller films
2014 independent films
American body horror films
American horror thriller films
American independent films
American monster movies
American serial killer films
American supernatural horror films
Cross Creek Pictures films
Dimension Films films
Films about cannibalism
Films about curses
Films about spirit possession
Films directed by Jon Watts
Films produced by Eli Roth
Films shot in Ottawa
Films with screenplays by Christopher Ford (screenwriter)
Horror films about clowns